Zakhopyorsky is a rural locality (a khutor) in Dobrinskoye Rural Settlement, Uryupinsky District, Volgograd Oblast, Russia. The population was 1 as of 2010.

Geography 
Zakhopyorsky is located in the valley of the Khopyor River, 14 km southwest of Uryupinsk (the district's administrative centre) by road. Gorsky is the nearest rural locality.

References 

Rural localities in Uryupinsky District